Events in the year 2017 in Syria.

Incumbents
 President: Bashar al-Assad
 Prime Minister: Imad Khamis

Events
For events related to the Civil War, see Timeline of the Syrian Civil War (January–April 2017), Timeline of the Syrian Civil War (May–August 2017) and Timeline of the Syrian Civil War (September–December 2017)

Deaths

1 January – Hilarion Capucci, Syrian Catholic bishop, titular archbishop of Caesarea in the Melkite Greek Catholic Church, died in Rome, Italy at the age of 94 (b. 1922)
5 January – Rafiq Subaie, actor and writer (b. 1930).
13 January – Zainuri Kamaruddin, Malaysian Islamist militant, killed in Syria (b. 1966/67).

References

 
2010s in Syria
Syria
Syria